Dulal Chandra Baruah (1 January 1932 - 4 October 2008) was a politician from Assam and Janata Dal (United) state unit President. He was deputy chief minister and PWD minister in Government of Assam headed by Golap Borbora in 1979. He was a Member of Assam Legislative Assembly for Jorhat and Charaibahi.

Early life and education 
Baruah was born on 1 January 1932, the son of the late Jogendra Nath Baruah. He had a B.A from 1957. He was educated at Dhakuakhana, Cotton College, Gauhati and St Anthony’s College, Shillong.

Early career 
Barua was appointed a secret agent of the Congress organisation for passing secret and important messages in 1942. He represented All India Student Congress, New Delhi in 1947. He entered government service in 1951 and resigned in 1960 to join post graduate classes.

Political career 
Baruah was an independent candidate in the 1962 Assam Legislative Assembly election. He received 7848 votes and won the Jorhat seat. He served until the 1967 Assam Legislative Assembly election where he did not seek reelection in Jorhat. He was succeeded by J. Saikia.

In the 1972 Assam Legislative Assembly election, Baruah sought the newly established constituency of Charaibahi as an independent candidate. Baruah received 13082 votes, 50.33% of the total vote. He defeated his nearest opponent an Indian National Congress Candidate, by 3208 votes. He served until the 1978 Assam Legislative Assembly election, when the constituency was later abolished. He instead sought in the 1978 Assam Legislative Assembly Election the Jorhat seat as a Janata Party candidate. He received 22530 votes, 53.88% of the total vote. He defeated his nearest opponent by 14963 votes and became the MLA for Jorhat again.

Baruah was made Deputy Chief Minister of Assam under Chief Minister Golap Borbora as well as being the PWD minister. He served until 1979. He did not seek reelection in Jorhat in the 1983 Assam Legislative Assembly election.

He joined BJP in 1999 at the behest of Prime Minister Atal Bihari Vajpayee after being promised a ticket but was later denied this due to him being a newcomer in 2004. He resigned from the party and later joined AGP, he was then made the AGP candidate for the Jorhat Lok Sabha constituency but lost.

Death 
Suffering from cancer, he died on 4 October 2008 in a private hospital in Mumbai and was survived by his daughter and two sons. His wife had predeceased him.

References

2008 deaths
Deputy chief ministers of Assam
Janata Party politicians
Janata Dal (United) politicians
Asom Gana Parishad politicians
Bharatiya Janata Party politicians from Assam
1929 births
Assam MLAs 1962–1967
Assam MLAs 1972–1978
Assam MLAs 1978–1983